The Syracuse Crunch are a professional ice hockey team in the American Hockey League (AHL). They play in Syracuse, New York, at the Upstate Medical University Arena. They are the primary development affiliate of the National Hockey League's Tampa Bay Lightning.

History

Vancouver and Pittsburgh affiliations (1994–2000)
The franchise originated in 1992 as the Hamilton Canucks, which was an affiliate of the NHL's Vancouver Canucks. The Canucks played in Hamilton, Ontario, for two seasons, before relocating to upstate New York in 1994. They were then renamed the "Crunch" from a public vote that included five names. The Crunch played their first game in Syracuse on September 30, 1994, against the Albany River Rats to a 7–7 tie with Lonny Bohonos scoring the first Crunch goal. The Crunch finished their first season 29–42–9–0, fifth place in the division, and outside the playoffs. The Crunch made the playoffs in the following season after finishing 31–37–5–7 and made it to the 1996 conference finals before losing to the eventual Calder Cup champion Rochester Americans. The team led the league in sellouts in 1996–97 and 1997–98 seasons. In 1997, the Crunch added a second NHL affiliate with the Pittsburgh Penguins.

The 1998–99 AHL season was the Crunch's worst season in franchise history. The Crunch would finish the season with a league-worst record of 18–50–9–3. On November 25, 1998, the Crunch suffered their worst loss in team history to the Providence Bruins, with a 14–2 final score. They allowed an AHL record of 10 goals in the first period. Goalie Craig Hillier allowed seven goals before being pulled for Mike Valley, who also allowed seven. The Penguins' affiliation ended after this season when they launched the Wilkes-Barre/Scranton Penguins.

On October 30, 1999, while playing against Rochester, goaltender Christian Bronsard scored the first and only Crunch goalie goal. Bronsard became the fourth goaltender in American Hockey League history to score a goal.

The Crunch qualified for the playoffs following the 1999–2000 season, their last season as Vancouver's AHL affiliate, but lost in the first round to the Hamilton Bulldogs.

Columbus affiliation (2000–2010)
The Crunch became the affiliate of the newly formed Columbus Blue Jackets following the 1999–2000 season. They made the playoffs in their first season under the Jackets, but lost in five games to the Wilkes-Barre/Scranton Penguins in the first round. In the following 2001–02 season, the Crunch won their first division title in franchise history behind goaltender Jean-Francois Labbe. In addition to the division title, they also were regular season Western Conference champions, with a conference-leading 96 points. However, they were two points shy of tying the Bridgeport Sound Tigers for the AHL lead, and three points shy of winning the Macgregor Kilpatrick Trophy for top team in the regular season. After receiving a bye in the Conference Qualifiers round, the Crunch swept the Philadelphia Phantoms in three games, but lost to the eventual Calder Cup champion Chicago Wolves in the next round in seven games.

On March 17, 2002, the Crunch played against the Wilkes-Barre/Scranton Penguins. This game was infamously named the "St. Patrick's Day Massacre". The Crunch accumulated 124 penalty minutes, 80 of which were fighting-related, while the Penguins had 162 penalty minutes with 102 for fighting. The Crunch won the game 4–0. The Crunch would miss the playoffs the following season, their second-worst season in franchise history, finishing 27-41-8-4.

In the 2004 Calder Cup playoffs, the Crunch became the twelfth team to blow a 3–1 series lead when they lost to the Rochester Americans in the first round. The Crunch were on home ice for game seven and forward Kent McDonnell missed an empty net when the Americans' goalie Ryan Miller was caught out of position. Rochester then recovered with an odd-man rush and Norm Milley beat Crunch goalie Karl Goehring to win the game in overtime.

The 2005–06 season was the best season the Crunch had during the 80-game schedule format. They scored a team record of 272 goals, but they also allowed 251 goals, and ended the regular season second in their division, 13 points behind Grand Rapids. They also had 47 wins, which is tied with their 2018–19 season record, albeit in four less games with the 76-game schedule. Andy Delmore won the Eddie Shore Award, scoring 72 points in 66 games, while also making the AHL First All-Star team at the end of the season. Mark Hartigan also scored 75 points in 49 games, averaging over a point and a half per game. They then lost in the first round of the 2006 Calder Cup playoffs to the Manitoba Moose in six games.

During the 2007–08 season, the Crunch went on a 15-game winning streak at the end of the season from March 8 to April 13, 2008, to make the playoffs. The Crunch also went without losing a game in regulation for the final 23 games of the season, spanning from February 22 to April 13, 2008. They defeated the Manitoba Moose in six games, where five of them went to overtime. They advanced to the second round to face the Toronto Marlies, but blew another 3–1 series lead.

The Crunch played the first outdoor game in AHL history on February 20, 2010, against the Binghamton Senators. The Mirabito Outdoor Classic took place at the Grandstand at the New York State Fairgrounds in Syracuse. The game set a then AHL attendance record of 21,508. Syracuse won the game 2–1, with goals scored by Alexandre Picard and David Liffiton. Goaltender Kevin Lalande made 36 saves en route to the Syracuse victory.

The Crunch missed the playoffs in their final two seasons as the affiliate of the Blue Jackets, as they switched their affiliation to the Springfield Falcons in 2010.

Anaheim affiliation (2010–2012)
The Anaheim affiliation lasted two seasons, resulting in one playoff appearance in the 2011–12 season. They lost in the first round to the St. John's IceCaps in four games. The affiliation produced future NHL players such as Kyle Palmieri, Nick Bonino, and Patrick Maroon.

Tampa Bay affiliation (2012–present)
The Crunch signed a multi-year affiliation deal with the Tampa Bay Lightning beginning with the 2012–13 season. The affiliation bought immediate success, resulting in the team's first division championship in 11 years. At the end of the 2012–13 regular season, Tyler Johnson won the Les Cunningham Award, Willie Marshall Award, and the President's Award. He was the first MVP in Crunch history. He totaled 65 points, scoring 37 goals and assisted on 28 goals. The team reached the 2013 Calder Cup finals, their first ever Calder Cup appearance, but lost to the Grand Rapids Griffins.

On November 22, 2014, the Syracuse Crunch set a new United States indoor professional hockey attendance record with 30,715 fans at the Carrier Dome for the "Toyota Frozen Dome Classic". Syracuse defeated the Utica Comets 2–1.

The Crunch won their second division title under the Tampa affiliation in the 2016–17 season. They advanced to their second Calder Cup appearance, again against the Grand Rapids Griffins. The Griffins took the series in six games and won the series 4–2. They also lost an AHL record eight road games during the playoffs.

On May 5, 2018, the Syracuse Crunch played their longest game in team history, which the Crunch lost 2–1 in double overtime to the Toronto Marlies. The game lasted 95 minutes and 10 seconds. The Crunch previously played two double-overtime games, both in the 2017 Calder Cup playoffs. They played a double-overtime game in the first round against the St. John's IceCaps, resulting in a 4–3 double-overtime win. That game lasted 90 minutes and 37 seconds, their previous record. They also played another double-overtime game in the 2017 Calder Cup Finals, a 6–5 loss in double overtime to the Grand Rapids Griffins, lasting 87 minutes and 2 seconds.

The 2018–19 season was the best season the Crunch has had during the 76-game schedule format. The Crunch tied a team record in points with 102, and tied a franchise record in wins with 47. Eddie Pasquale won the Harry "Hap" Holmes Memorial Award, Carter Verhaeghe won the John B. Sollenberger Trophy, and Verhaeghe and Alex Barre-Boulet both won the Willie Marshall Award, as they both tied for the league lead in goals scored. The Crunch also achieved 900 franchise victories with a 6–2 win over the Utica Comets on March 30, 2019. The Crunch won their third division title in the Tampa affiliation, but were upset in four games by the Cleveland Monsters.

The Crunch played their first 62 games of the 2019–20 season, but the season was suspended on March 12, 2020, due to the COVID-19 pandemic. The season was ultimately cancelled on May 11, 2020. The start of the following season was also pushed back to February 5, 2021. The Crunch also gained a temporary second NHL affiliation in the Florida Panthers as their AHL affiliate, the Charlotte Checkers, opted out of participating in the abbreviated season. 

Prior to the pandemic-related schedule changes, the Crunch were to face the Utica Comets in an outdoor game hosted by Utica at the Griffiss Business and Technology Park in Rome, New York, on February 13, 2021, however, the game did not take place as scheduled.

Syracuse hockey history
American Hockey League teams that played in Syracuse:
Syracuse Stars (1930–1936) in the Original IHL
Syracuse Stars (1936–1940) in the IAHL – The first team to win the Calder Cup in (1936–37)
Syracuse Warriors (1951–1954)
Syracuse Eagles (1974–75)
Syracuse Firebirds (1979–80)
Other hockey teams that played in Syracuse:
Syracuse Braves (1962–1963) (EPHL)
Syracuse Blazers (1967–1973) (EHL)
Syracuse Blazers (1973–1977) (NAHL)
Syracuse Condors (Granted a franchise by the NAHL for 1977–78 season, but the league folded and the team never played a game)
Syracuse Hornets (1980–1981) (EHL) – played only ten games (0-9-1)
Syracuse Jr. Crunch/Syracuse Stars (1996–2005) in the Metro Junior A Hockey League and Ontario Provincial Junior A Hockey League

Logos
Owner Howard Dolgon came up with the superhero mascot Crunchman for the team's debut in 1994. In 2000, as the Crunch became an affiliate of the Columbus Blue Jackets, Crunchman was replaced with Al the Ice Gorilla. Al remained until 2012, when Dolgon found the new affiliation with Tampa Bay a good reason to return with Crunchman.

Season-by-season results

Players and coaches

Current roster
Updated March 15, 2023.

|}

Team captains

Dane Jackson, 1994–1995
Mark Wotton, 1995–1999
Brian Bonin, 1999–2000
Mike Gaul, 2000–2001
Sean Pronger, 2001–2002
David Ling, 2002–2003
Darrel Scoville, 2003–2004
Jamie Pushor, 2004–2007
Zenon Konopka, 2007–2008
Dan Smith, 2008–2009
Derek MacKenzie, 2009–2010
Joe DiPenta, 2010–2011
Nate Guenin, 2011–2012
Mike Angelidis, 2012–2016
Luke Witkowski, 2016–2017, 2019–2021
Erik Condra, 2017–2018
Gabriel Dumont, 2018–2019, 2021–present

Head coaches

Jack McIlhargey: 1994–1999
Stan Smyl: 1999–2000
Gary Agnew: 2000–2006
Ross Yates: 2006–2010
Mark Holick: 2010–2012
Trent Yawney: 2012
Jon Cooper: 2012–2013
Rob Zettler: 2013–2016
Benoit Groulx: 2016–present

Current coaching staff
Benoit Groulx — Head coach
Gilles Bouchard — Assistant coach
Eric Veilleux — Assistant coach
 Joe Palmer — Goaltending and video coach

Honored numbers
The Crunch raised a banner following a fan vote during the team's fifth season in honor of fan favorite #14 "Big Bad" John Badduke. It is not retired, as it would later be worn by former United States Olympian Darby Hendrickson, Serge Aubin, Richard Panik, Justin Courtnall, Brandon Alderson, Mike McNamee, Kevin Lynch, Devante Stephens and most recently, Brandon Crawley.

During the 2008–09 AHL season, the team temporarily reserved, but not retired, #7 as a tribute to Paul Newman after his death. This honors Reg Dunlop, the player-coach for the fictional Charlestown Chiefs, which Newman played in the movie Slap Shot. The movie was filmed partially at Onondaga County War Memorial. Coincidentally, other scenes were filmed at Cambria County War Memorial Arena in Johnstown, Pennsylvania, the home ice of the Crunch's former ECHL affiliate, the Johnstown Chiefs. The banner was raised October 14 and was up for the entire season, but the number was not retired, as it was most recently worn by Crunch player Mathieu Joseph in the 2019–20 season.

On March 26, 2016, the Syracuse Crunch retired Dolph Schayes' number #4. Schayes played for the Syracuse Nationals and their successor, the Philadelphia 76ers. He was the first player in the National Basketball Association to score 15,000 points in his career. This number isn't officially retired, as the number was most recently worn by Trevor Carrick during the 2022–23 season.

Notable Crunch alumni

Franchise records and leaders
Records as of the beginning of the 2022–23 AHL season

Single season records
Goals: Lonny Bohonos, 40 (1995–96)
Assists: Bill Bowler, 58 (2000–01)
Points: Carter Verhaeghe, 82 (2018–19)
Penalty minutes: Jody Shelley, 357 (2000–01)
Wins: Corey Hirsch, 30 (1997–98)
GAA: Jean-Francois Labbe, 2.18 (2001–02)
SV%: Jean-Francois Labbe, .928 (2001–02)

Single postseason records
Minimum 10 Calder Cup playoff games played
Goals: Lonny Bohonos, 14 (1996)
Assists: Ondrej Palat, 19 (2013)
Points: Cory Conacher, 28 (2017)
Penalty minutes: Richard Panik, 59 (2013)
Wins: Cedrick Desjardins (2013) and Mike McKenna (2017), 13
GAA: Jean-Francois Labbe, 1.91 (2002)
SV%: Jean-Francois Labbe, .939 (2002)

Career records
Career games: Brad Moran, 334
Career goals: Mark Hartigan, 107
Career assists: Brad Moran, 143
Career points: Brad Moran, 241
Career penalty minutes: Jeremy Reich, 820
Career goaltending wins: Karl Goehring, 78
Career shutouts: Jean-Francois Labbe and Karl Goehring, 11

Trophies and awards

Award winners

Dudley "Red" Garrett Memorial Award
Alex Barre-Boulet (2018–19)

Eddie Shore Award
Andy Delmore (2005–06)
Matt Taormina (2016–17)

Harry "Hap" Holmes Memorial Award
Eddie Pasquale (2018–19)

James C. Hendy Memorial Award
Vance Lederman (2014–15)

James H. Ellery Memorial Awards
Adam Benigni (1994–95)
Seth Everett (1995–96)
Lindsay Kramer (1996–97)

John B. Sollenberger Trophy
Carter Verhaeghe (2018–19)

Ken McKenzie Award
Tim Kuhl (1994–95, 1995–96)
Jim Sarosy (2001–02, 2009–10)

Les Cunningham Award
Tyler Johnson (2012–13)

Thomas Ebright Memorial Award
Howard Dolgon (2013–14)

Willie Marshall Award
Tyler Johnson (2012–13)
Carter Verhaeghe, Alex Barre-Boulet (2018–19)

Yanick Dupre Memorial Award
Eric Neilson (2013–14)
Brad Chavis (2020–21)

References

External links
Syracuse Crunch Official Website

 
Tampa Bay Lightning minor league affiliates
Ice hockey teams in New York (state)
1994 establishments in New York (state)
Ice hockey clubs established in 1994
Vancouver Canucks minor league affiliates
Pittsburgh Penguins minor league affiliates
Columbus Blue Jackets minor league affiliates
Anaheim Ducks minor league affiliates